This is a list of characters from the Rocky film series, consisting of Rocky (1976), Rocky II (1979), Rocky III (1982), Rocky IV (1985), Rocky V (1990), Rocky Balboa (2006), Creed (2015), Creed II (2018) and Creed III (2023).

Principal characters

Rocky Balboa

Robert "Rocky" Balboa (also known by his ring name The Italian Stallion, played by Sylvester Stallone), is the title character and main protagonist of the Rocky film series. The character was created by Sylvester Stallone, who has also portrayed him in all eight films in the franchise. He is depicted as an everyman who started out by going the distance and overcoming obstacles that had occurred in his life and career as a professional boxer. In the Creed films, he trains Apollo Creed's illegitimate son Adonis to win the world heavyweight championship.

Adonis Creed

Adonis "Donnie" Johnson Creed, "Hollywood Donnie" (born Adonis Johnson, played by Michael B. Jordan), is the protagonist and titular character from the Rocky film series sequel, Creed. He is the son of world champion Apollo Creed, from an affair shortly before he died. Adonis is trained by Apollo's friend and former rival, fellow world champion Rocky Balboa. He went on to become a second generation world champion.

Main characters

Adrian Pennino

Adrianna "Adrian" Balboa (née Pennino, played by Talia Shire) is Rocky's girlfriend, and later wife. She is the mother of their only child Robert Balboa Jr. She appears in the original five Rocky movies. In Rocky Balboa, it is revealed that Adrian died in 2002, after 26 years of marriage, she died of ovarian cancer, and four years before the events of Rocky Balboa. Much of the film's premise is Rocky's grieving over losing Adrian.

Paulie Pennino

Paul "Paulie" Pennino (played by Burt Young) is Adrian's older brother and Rocky Balboa's best friend, later his brother-in-law when Rocky marries Adrian. He is one of only three characters to appear in the first six films. Young was nominated for the Academy Award for Best Supporting Actor for his performance in the first film, along with co-star Burgess Meredith. 

He works at a meat-rendering facility and is portrayed as having a drinking problem and tending towards self-pity, immaturity and emotional outbursts. In Rocky, when Rocky Balboa quits his "collection" job with a local loan shark, Paulie takes his place; this mafioso angle was dropped after the second film. Though he cares for his friends and family, he is often jealous of their happiness and success and feels they owe him. If someone insults Rocky in his presence, Paulie usually reacts with anger and withering insults. Paulie is racist, as seen in Rocky III when he openly stated that he did not like any of the black boxers in the gym where Apollo Creed once trained. He also says in Rocky Balboa that "Italian food cooked up by a bunch of Mexicans ain't so special."  In response to challenges to fight, his catchphrase is "I don't sweat you", after which he is usually quickly defeated (by Thunderlips in Rocky III, by Rocky himself also in Rocky III, and by Tommy Gunn in Rocky V). Rocky describes Paulie in Rocky III as "like a crazy brother".

Paulie introduced his sister, Adrian, to Rocky and generally encouraged their relationship. Paulie also invited Rocky to begin his unique training method of punching sides of beef at the rendering facility.

Paulie visits Rocky in the hospital after his title match with Apollo Creed. After Rocky marries Adrian, he congratulates them. Later, he recommends Rocky for his former meat packing job; he also buys Rocky's car from him after the latter is laid off. He is disappointed later when he sees Rocky training amateurs in Mighty Mick's Gym; Paulie visits the pet shop where Adrian works and yells at her for refusing to let Rocky continue his boxing career; the stress of the argument causes her to go into premature labor. He later helps care for the baby on the night of Rocky's rematch with Creed. Though he is disappointed at the beginning of Rocky's match, he eventually jumps in joy and hugs Adrian when Rocky is victorious.

When Rocky, now heavyweight champion, wins a number of succeeding matches and becomes increasingly wealthy and famous, Paulie becomes jealous. Wandering around drunk, he walks into an arcade hall, and, after seeing a pinball machine with a Rocky theme, he hurls his liquor bottle at it, destroying the machine. He is arrested and jailed. Rocky bails him out, but Paulie is still angry, claiming Rocky holds him down and owes him. Paulie briefly attempts to fight Rocky, who easily evades him, and the exhausted Paulie finally asks him for a job. Rocky agrees and hires him as a cornerman. Later, Paulie tries to fight the wrestler Thunderlips, who is strangling Rocky during an exhibition match. Paulie accompanies Rocky and Adrian to Los Angeles, but complains about the flophouse they are staying in, which annoys Apollo. At the end of the film, Paulie once again is happy about Rocky's victory.

Rocky gives Paulie a birthday present: a robot servant called Sico (an actual robot invented by International Robotics founder Robert Doornick) that fetches him drinks and snacks. Paulie's gruff, unsentimental demeanor is highlighted by the brusque disdain with which he initially treats his mechanical helpmeet - dismissing the robot as "a walking trashcan." Later, Paulie introduces the robot, now reprogrammed with a female voice, as "my girl" to Apollo Creed and claims that she loves him. Paulie accompanies Rocky and Tony Duke to Siberia to help Rocky train for his match against Ivan Drago. As before in Los Angeles, Paulie gripes about the weather and the austere conditions of the cabin in which they will be staying. Prior to Rocky's match against Drago, Paulie tells Rocky of the admiration and love he has for his best friend.

In the fifth film, Paulie and Adrian have a furious argument in Rocky's mansion after returning home from Russia: Paulie had unwittingly signed a power of attorney over to Rocky's accountant, who had squandered all of Rocky's money on poor real estate deals and also failed to pay Rocky's taxes over the past six years. The mansion they all live in has been mortgaged for $400,000, and with Rocky forced into retirement due to brain damage, they must sell the mansion and most of their belongings. They move back to their old residence in the Kensington section of Philadelphia. When Rocky stops paying attention to his son and shifts his entire focus to training a young boxer from Oklahoma named Tommy Gunn, a dismayed Paulie steps in and begins training and spending more time with his nephew. Later, after Tommy has betrayed Rocky, he shows up at a bar to challenge Rocky to a street fight. Paulie insults and heaps scorn on Tommy for his selfishness. Tommy punches Paulie, after which Rocky accepts Tommy's challenge and the two engage in a brawl on the street.

Sixteen years later, Paulie is shown having resumed his meat-packing job. Initially skeptical of Rocky's desire to return to fighting after a fifteen-year hiatus, Paulie becomes fully supportive when he is laid off from the factory. He is also shown helping Rocky train and operate his restaurant, Adrian's (named after Paulie's sister, Rocky's wife, who died four years prior to the events of the film). When Rocky agrees to an exhibition match against heavyweight champion Mason "The Line" Dixon, Paulie again becomes his cornerman and compliments him after the match.

Paulie is shown as having died on February 22, 2012. He was buried next to Adrian. Rocky visits his grave on his birthday and leaves a bottle of his favorite liquor on his headstone after which he sits and reads the newspaper. When Donnie Creed moves in with Rocky, he stays in Paulie's old bedroom.

Apollo Creed

Apollo Creed (played by Carl Weathers) is a heavyweight boxing champion who is a rival and later friend of Rocky Balboa. He appears in the first four Rocky movies. After a bout against Soviet boxer Ivan Drago, Apollo dies from severe head trauma sustained during his match. His son Adonis is trained by Rocky in the Creed films.

Mickey Goldmill

Mickey Goldmill (played by Burgess Meredith), is Rocky's trainer who used to be a professional boxer (specifically the Bantamweight division) when he was younger. He mainly appears in the first three movies. He also appears in the fifth film. He dies from a heart attack halfway through the third film shortly after Rocky's bout with Clubber Lang.

Clubber Lang

James "Clubber" Lang (portrayed by Mr. T) is the main antagonist in Rocky III. Lang is a professional boxer fighting out of Chicago, Illinois. He primarily trains himself, and is both enormously strong and extremely arrogant. He easily defeats all opponents before challenging Rocky Balboa at a public event, where he also makes a lewd suggestion to Adrian; this causes an infuriated Rocky to accept the challenge, even though he had earlier decided to retire. Before the match, Lang is involved in a scuffle with Rocky, which precipitates the heart attack that kills Mickey. Lang defeats Rocky, who has lost his confidence, as quickly as his other opponents to become world heavyweight champion. Lang loses the title back to Rocky in his next match after Apollo Creed and Duke Evers train Rocky and help him regain his confidence.

Ludmilla Vobet Drago

Ludmilla Vobet-Drago (Russian: Людмила Вобет Драго, played by Brigitte Nielsen), is a former Olympic swimmer for the Soviet Union (present-day Russia) and Ivan Drago's wife in Rocky IV. Along with manager Nicolai Koloff, she acts as Ivan's spokesperson, describing the power of his punches and firmly believes her husband is impossible to defeat in a boxing match. Ivan is a man of few words. Because of this, Ludmilla always spoke for him during interviews. However, Rocky soon proves her wrong when he succeeds in defeating Drago by KO much to her ire and dismay.

She had been a professional swimmer who competed in the Olympics, winning two gold medals. At some point in her life she met an officer of the Soviet Army named Ivan Drago, who had been trained to be a professional boxer. 

In Creed II, it is revealed that after Ivan's loss to Rocky, Ivan was disgraced by the USSR, where he was shamed and kicked out of the country, tainting the Drago name forever. In 1990, Ludmilla gave birth to Viktor but soon after divorced Ivan and left him to raise their son on his own in Ukraine. She is part of the Russian group that supports her estranged son Viktor in his rematch against Donnie Creed, despite Viktor's animosity towards her for betraying him and his father. During the 10th and final round of the match, Ludmilla leaves the arena in disgust when Viktor is knocked down again by Donnie. Viktor ends up losing the bout without the presence of the Russian spectators and his mother. 

In real-life, Brigitte Nielsen was engaged to Sylvester Stallone (who plays Rocky), during production of Rocky IV, and married shortly after the release. They divorced in 1987.

Ivan Drago

Ivan Drago (played by Dolph Lundgren) is a boxer from the Soviet Union (present-day Russia). He first appeared in the 1985 film Rocky IV, in which he is Rocky Balboa's rival and the main antagonist.

In Creed II, it is revealed that after Ivan's loss to Rocky, Ivan was disgraced by the USSR, where he was shamed and kicked out of the country, tainting the Drago name forever. In 1990, Ludmilla gave birth to Viktor but soon after divorced him and left him to raise their son on his own in Ukraine. She is part of the Russian group that supports her estranged son Viktor in his rematch against Donnie Creed, despite Viktor's animosity towards her for betraying him and his father. During the 10th and final round of the match, Ludmilla leaves the arena in disgust when Viktor is knocked down again by Donnie. Ivan throws in the towel, realizing Viktor's safety is most important.

Rocky Balboa Jr.

 Robert Balboa Jr., (Bobby) is the only son of Rocky and Adrian. In Rocky II, he is born one month prematurely after Adrian experiences sudden labour while arguing with Paulie. 

Robert Balboa Jr. is portrayed by Seargeoh Stallone in Rocky II, Ina Fried in Rocky III, Rocky Krakoff in Rocky IV, Sage Stallone in Rocky V, and Milo Ventimiglia as an adult Bobby in Rocky Balboa and Creed II. A photo of a nine-year-old Sage Stallone as Bobby, with Rocky, is seen in Creed.

Tommy Gunn

Tommy "The Machine" Gunn (played by Tommy Morrison) is a supporting character and the antagonist in Rocky V. Originally from Oklahoma, Gunn travels to South Philadelphia to seek training from former world heavyweight champion Rocky. Despite having a very short temper, he is accepted by Rocky as a protege. Gunn progressively advances in the ranks in the boxing world, at the cost of Rocky's relationship with his son Robert. Because he has no formal agreement with Rocky, Gunn is easily lured in by George Washington Duke's money. He eventually defeats Union Cane for the World Heavyweight Championship, but is not accepted by the fans or the press, who do not consider him as a true champion without a worthy opponent.  He also loses respect when, after his title win, he publicly thanks Duke and not Rocky for his success and stardom. Duke convinces him to challenge Rocky, but the fight ends up on the street with Gunn on the losing end. After Rocky left him on the ground, he was escorted away by two police officers and arrested.

Mason "The Line" Dixon

Mason "The Line" Dixon (played by Antonio Tarver) is the undisputed World Heavyweight Champion in Rocky Balboa. His reign is unpopular due to a lack of formidable competition, until ESPN airs a computer simulation of a dream match of him losing to Rocky; this brings enough attention for Dixon's promoters to stage a real version of the match in Las Vegas, with a portion of the proceeds going to charity. Despite predictions of Rocky being knocked out early, the match goes the entire distance of 10 rounds. During the second round, Dixon injures his left hand after punching Rocky in the hip; Rocky takes full advantage of this injury throughout the duration of the fight. Dixon eventually wins by a narrow split decision, thus he retains his undefeated streak.

Bianca Creed

Bianca Taylor Creed (played by Tessa Thompson) is a singer, music producer, and wife of Donnie Creed. She wears hearing aids due to progressive hearing loss. Bianca first meets Donnie when he confronts her over her loud music in her apartment on his first night in Philadelphia. A few nights later, after discovering Bianca performing a concert at a night club, Donnie asks her out and they develop a relationship. This relationship is strained when Donnie is jailed for punching a musician for calling him "Baby Creed", but they reconcile shortly after they discover that Rocky has been diagnosed with non-Hodgkin lymphoma.

In Creed II, Bianca's music career kicks off with a recording contract, but shortly after Donnie proposes to her, she discovers that she is pregnant. Bianca gives birth to a baby girl named Amara, but it is discovered that Amara is born deaf due to Bianca's progressive degenerative hearing disorder being hereditary.

Mary Anne Creed
Mary Anne Creed is the wife and later widow of Apollo Creed. In Creed, she adopts Adonis "Donnie" Johnson, who is Apollo's illegitimate son, in 1998. In 2015, she discovers that Donnie has quit a lucrative job at a securities firm to follow his father's footsteps as a boxer, much to her dismay. She eventually supports him by sending him a pair of "stars and stripes" boxing trunks for his match against "Pretty" Ricky Conlan. She watches her son's match on television, reacting with pride with his performance.

In Creed II, Mary Anne is happy that Donnie and Bianca would move close to her in Los Angeles, however she is dismayed when she learns it is so Donnie could take the challenge to fight Viktor Drago, the son of Ivan Drago, who killed Apollo in the ring. She admonishes Donnie by telling him that his match is not to avenge his father but for personal pride and vengeance, and attempts to dissuade him from the fight due to having a family to lose. After Donnie is heavily injured in the fight, Mary Anne contacts Rocky to encourage him to reconcile with Donnie and train with him for the rematch. Mary Anne joins the rematch in person in Moscow and celebrates when Donnie wins.

In Creed III, Mary Anne is happy to be close with her family, especially bonding with her granddaughter Amara, but her health has significantly decreased. Following a stroke, Donnie and Bianca are careful in keeping her healthy. She becomes disturbed when she hears that Donnie has reconnected with Dame, Donnie's former best friend who he sneaks out with from her home to hang out with. She later opens a box filled with letters sent from Dame in prison to Donnie, which she refused to share with her son due to her believing he was a bad influence on him. She calls Donnie and reveals this to him, which shocks Donnie, who calls her out for keeping this from him which led to Dame manipulating Donnie's downfall all these years later. Mary Anne later suffers from another fatal stroke and Donnie joins her at her deathbed, where in her delirium she talks with Apollo and thanks him for giving her Donnie before she passes away.

Mary Anne Creed is portrayed by Lavelle Roby in Rocky, Sylvia Meals in Rocky II and Rocky IV, and Phylicia Rashad in Creed, Creed II and Creed III .

"Pretty" Ricky Conlan

"Pretty" Ricky Conlan is the Lineal World Light Heavyweight Champion, #1 Pound for Pound Boxer in the world in Creed. The Liverpudlian boxer faces a seven-year prison sentence for illegal firearms possession. He is initially slated to defend his title against Danny "Stuntman" Wheeler, but the fight is canceled when Conlan breaks Wheeler's jaw during a press conference. His manager Tommy Holiday convinces him to fight Donnie Creed as a last hurrah before serving his prison sentence. Conlan is shown to not have much respect for the legendary fighters of the past claiming, "No cares about Balboa anymore" and taunting Donnie for being a "false Creed" believing that Donnie only earned his shot through his name alone with "not a real fight in [Donnie's] life". Conlan has a "rags to riches" background as his father worked on the docks. Conlan predicts an early end, but Donnie goes the distance. Despite being knocked down for the first time in his career by the end of the 12th round, Conlan narrowly wins by a split decision. He shows respect for Donnie, telling him he is the future of the sport and imploring that Donnie wears the "Creed" name with pride.

Conlan returns in Creed III, where he has a long-awaited rematch following his release from prison. Donnie finally beats Conlan by knockout, and Donnie later retires from boxing.

"Pretty" Ricky Conlan is portrayed by Tony Bellew.

Tony "Little Duke" Evers Jr.
Tony "Little Duke" Evers Jr. is the son of Tony "Duke" Evers, the former trainer of Apollo Creed and Rocky. Due to Apollo and Tony's father-son relationship, “Little Duke” is something of an uncle-figure to Donnie. In Creed, Little Duke urges Donnie Creed not to pursue a boxing career. In Creed II, Donnie has Little Duke train him for his match with Viktor Drago after Rocky refuses to train him, but eventually assists Rocky in training Donnie in his rematch to Viktor Drago. He also returns in Creed III helping train Donnie to fight his childhood friend who challenged Donnie after his release from prison. 

Tony "Little Duke" Evers Jr. is portrayed by Wood Harris.

Viktor Drago

Viktor Drago (Russian: Виктор Драго) is the son of Ivan Drago and a second generation boxer. Following his defeat at the hands of Rocky Balboa in 1985, Ivan lost his prestige as a Soviet boxer and his wife Ludmilla abandoned him and Viktor. Since then, Ivan has trained Viktor to be the best boxer in Ukraine. Boxing promoter Buddy Marcelle has Viktor challenge Donnie Creed for the WBC title at Barclays Center in Brooklyn. Despite objections by Rocky, Donnie accepts the challenge, but Rocky decides not to be in his corner. Viktor overwhelms Donnie with his brute strength and long reach throughout the match. In the third round, Viktor breaks Donnie's left ribs and knocks him down, but is disqualified when he punches Donnie while the referee is still counting.

In the months that follow, Viktor later enjoys popularity in Russia where he wins several top-billed fights, but faces heavy pressure behind-the-scenes from his father and his newfound attention, especially from media and Russian delegates. During a state dinner attended by his mother, Viktor is enraged at seeing her, later walking out and chastising his father for seeking approval from those who previously disowned them.

Viktor later demands a rematch against Donnie; this time in Moscow. Donnie accepts the challenge once more, but now with Rocky and Little Duke in his corner. Donnie surprises Viktor with his lightning-fast reflexes and high stamina throughout the match. Viktor knocks down Donnie several times, but Donnie displays his resilience by getting up and exploiting Viktor's tendency to overextend his punches; at the same time, he progressively wears out Viktor by going beyond the fourth round, as Viktor has been accustomed to only quick knockouts. By the tenth round, Viktor is knocked down for the first time in his professional career. He is further demoralized when Ludmilla walks out of the match after being knocked down for a second time. Seeing his son receive more strikes from Donnie without any counterattacks, Ivan throws in the towel and concedes the match to Donnie. Viktor and Ivan return to their simple life in Ukraine, having grown in understanding with one another.

Viktor returns in Creed III (2023), having become an experienced fighter and become acquainted with Donnie. Donnie organizes a match between his prótégé, Felix "El Guerrero" Chavez, and Viktor, however Viktor is assaulted and injured by several men during Bianca's label party. Donnie later realizes the men were former inmates sent by Damian "Diamond Dame" Anderson to orchestrate Dame's winning match against Chavez. Upon his recovery, Viktor helps Adonis train for his upcoming fight against Dame.

Viktor Drago is portrayed by German-Romanian actor, model, and real-life professional boxer Florian "Big Nasty" Munteanu.

Additional main characters

Tony "Duke" Evers

Tony "Duke" Evers (played by Tony Burton) was initially the manager/trainer to the world champion Apollo Creed until his in-ring death after his bout with Ivan Drago, before eventually becoming the manager to Apollo's friend Rocky Balboa. He was portrayed by Tony Burton and is one of only four characters (along with Rocky, Paulie Pennino, and Stu Nahan) to have been featured in the original six Rocky films.

Tony "Duke" Evers was first introduced in the 1976 Oscar-winning film Rocky as the trainer to the charismatic World Heavyweight Champion Apollo Creed. A planned Bicentennial fight against number one contender Mac Lee Green was scheduled for January 1, 1976, which Apollo gladly hypes whenever someone places a microphone in front of him. However, Green hurts his left hand in training, and when none of the other top ranked contenders, such as Ernie Roman and Buddy Shaw, step up to face the champion, Creed responds with a novelty promotion that will generate huge publicity. He will offer an anonymous local fighter an opportunity to battle Creed for the title, in a match on New Year's Day in Philadelphia, Pennsylvania. Creed eventually selects Rocky Balboa, then an unknown club fighter, a shot at the championship. While Creed dismissed Rocky as a serious threat, Tony appeared to be the only member of Creed's staff who considered Balboa to be a legitimate threat, as he cautioned Creed of his vulnerability against southpaw opponents. Tony also expressed concern while closely observing Rocky's meat freezer sparring session at his friend Paulie's meat factory, which was broadcast on an edition of the evening news, saying to Creed, "Hey champ, you ought to come here and take a look at this kid you're gonna' fight, he looks like he means business". "Yeah, Yeah, I mean business, too. Shirley, go get me some more coffee." Creed replied in a casual and nonchalant tone as he and his entourage focused on business matters from another room. It is during this film where it is learned that Tony is more than just Apollo's trainer, but that they also have a long history and friendship dating back years.  Prior to the final round of Creed's title defense against Balboa, Tony unsuccessfully urges Creed to let him stop the fight, and thus forfeit the championship, because he is worried for Apollo's health after it is revealed that he is bleeding internally as a result of Balboa's heavy body shots.

In Rocky II, a humiliated Creed, despite winning a split decision, pushes to schedule a rematch with Rocky. However, Tony pleads with Apollo to leave Balboa alone as he does not want to see his friend suffer through another bout with Rocky, who had just given Creed the worst beating of his career. As Tony explained to Apollo, "I saw you beat that man like I never seen no man get beat before. And the man kept coming after you. We don't need that kind of man in our lives." This time, a focused Apollo trains hard under Tony's tutelage, and arrives at the rematch in the best shape of his career. Creed goes on to dominate the majority of the fight, although Tony remains wary of Rocky's punching power and determination. As a result, Tony advises Creed to fight defensively in the final round so as to win the bout on points and thus avoid a potential knockout defeat. During the 15th and final round, Tony frantically screams from Creed's corner for the champ to "Just stick and move! Stick and move! Stay away from him!" as Rocky switches to a southpaw stance.  Nevertheless, Apollo ignores Tony's advice and is subsequently KO'd by Balboa, thus dropping the championship in the process.

With Creed subsequently retiring after losing the championship, Tony returns to his hometown of Los Angeles, where he continues working with various up-and-coming local fighters at the "TOUGH GYM". However, Tony returns to the scene in Rocky III when Apollo Creed takes over as Rocky's manager following the death of Rocky's longtime trainer Mickey Goldmill and after Rocky's title defeat to James "Clubber" Lang. Creed brings Rocky to Los Angeles to formally meet Tony, who appears ecstatic over the idea of finally working on the same team of the "Italian Stallion" after the two brutal contests he had with Creed. Over the next few months, Creed and Tony completely revamp Balboa's fighting style after a shaky start. They introduce a more athletic style reminiscent of Creed's skilled boxing repertoire, as opposed to Rocky's traditional slugging technique. Moreover, Creed and Tony (along with Rocky's wife Adrian) also help to rebuild Rocky's self-esteem, which is left shattered after his knockout by Lang and the revelation that Mickey had handpicked some of his prior opponents in an effort to prevent him from serious injury, and to keep him winning. As a result, Apollo and Tony essentially take in Rocky as one of their own family after the loss of Mickey, who had served as Rocky's father figure during the course of his career. By the end of the movie, Rocky is a rejuvenated boxer, and Apollo and Tony celebrate by his side after he regains the championship after a third-round KO of Lang.

Several years later in Rocky IV, a now 42-year-old Apollo decides to come out of retirement for an exhibition bout against new Soviet sensation Ivan Drago in Las Vegas. To that end, Tony comes by to help Rocky and Paulie train Apollo for the event. However, in a tragic turn of events, Creed is unfortunately killed at the hands of Drago, consequently setting up a grudge match between Balboa and Drago in Moscow on Christmas Day 1985. Upon Creed's death, Tony confides in Balboa that Creed was like his own son, and that a piece of him has died along with Apollo. Now Rocky's main trainer, Tony subsequently travels with Rocky, Paulie and Adrian to the Soviet Union and assists Rocky in his training, providing him with encouragement while also telling him that he now stands as the carrier of Apollo's legacy. Rocky would ultimately knock out Drago in the fifteenth round to claim victory, much to Tony's delight.

Tony makes a brief appearance at the beginning of Rocky V, which begins immediately following the victory over Drago. While Rocky showers, Tony praised him for avenging Apollo's death and making the American public so proud. However, Rocky begins to experience physical complications after the beating he took from Drago, and Tony informs Adrian about this. After returning to the U.S., Rocky subsequently announces his retirement from boxing, and Tony presumably returns to Los Angeles as Rocky struggles with the loss of his fortune while moving back to his old Philadelphia neighborhood. Rocky soon becomes the manager to the new World Heavyweight Champion Tommy Gunn but Tony does not reappear in the film as Rocky eventually repels the challenge of a jealous Gunn in a street fight.

Tony "Duke" Evers returns for a sixth time in Rocky Balboa, which takes place fifteen years after the previous film. Rocky has long since retired and running a restaurant in Philadelphia following Adrian's death several years earlier. It is unclear whether Tony has continued to train other fighters, or if he has retired himself. Nevertheless, Tony returns as Rocky's trainer after Balboa agrees to an exhibition bout against the current World Heavyweight Champion Mason Dixon. Citing that the nearly 60-year-old Balboa lacks the speed, stamina, or durability to endure typical training, Tony decides to focus on Rocky's lone remaining asset - his incredible punching power - and develops a regimen focused on strength training and building "hurtin' bombs". Tony subsequently participates in the fight's press conference, in which Dixon dismisses Balboa's challenge, and states that Rocky always maintains a "puncher's chance". Rocky eventually battles the current champion through all ten rounds, and even knocks Dixon down in the second round. Though he loses by split decision (reminiscent of the first bout with Creed), Rocky was unconcerned with the outcome and celebrates his moral victory with Tony, Paulie and his son before leaving the ring.

Though Tony is not present in Creed, his presence remains as his son Tony Jr., known as "Little Duke". Tony Jr. runs the Delphi Boxing Academy in Los Angeles. When family-friend Donnie Creed asks for his assistance in training, Tony Jr. turns down the offer, looking out for his safety after the death of his father, Apollo, at the hands of Ivan Drago. Upset about the disagreement, Donnie opens up a challenge to anyone in the gym that if anyone could land a punch on his chin, they would win his car. After a successful first defense, Tony Jr.'s own student, Danny "Stuntman" Wheeler (played by actual light-heavyweight boxer Andre Ward) lays Creed out on the canvas and wins his car. Tony Jr. and Wheeler are both later seen training for a supposed match with "Pretty" Ricky Conlan in the intro of the film's version of HBO Boxing's 24/7 and the weigh-in in which Wheeler is assaulted by Conlan, breaking his jaw.

Tony Gazzo
Tony Gazzo (played by Joe Spinell) is a loan shark in Philadelphia who initially hires Rocky as an enforcer and collector to rough up people who owe him money. Even though Gazzo gets irritated whenever Rocky does not directly obey his orders, such as beating up people who are unable to pay him, he still has respect and patience for Rocky, even giving him money for a date with Adrian and later for his training for Rocky's first fight with Apollo. In the second film, Gazzo attends Rocky and Adrian's wedding. He unsuccessfully tries to persuade Rocky to come back to work for him multiple times. Gazzo is last seen in attendance to support Rocky in his rematch with Apollo.

George "Miles" Jergens
George "Miles" Jergens (played by Thayer David) is a successful boxing promoter who oversees Apollo Creed's fights. After Apollo proposes to fight a local contender for his United States Bicentennial match, Jergens invites Rocky to his office to secure a deal for the main event. He only appears in the first movie.

Spider Rico
Spider Rico is a Puerto Rican boxer who is Rocky's first opponent in Rocky. Both men fight in the match that is heavily booed by the spectators due to their lack of sportsmanship.  Rico headbutts Rocky, who responds by knocking Rico out with a flurry of punches and a ground-and-pound. In the locker room, Spider comments that Rocky "really got lucky.” He reappears in Rocky Balboa, by this time, he has become a priest.  He and Rocky are friends, and Rocky lets him eat for free in his restaurant. In addition, Rocky also gives Spider a job in the kitchen, where he prepares food and washes dishes. Spider also acts as one of Rocky's cornermen in his fight with Mason Dixon. In a deleted scene in Creed II , it's revealed that he has died as Rocky attends his funeral and reminisces about their fight together.

Nicolai Koloff
Nicolai Koloff (Russian: Николай Колофф) is Ivan Drago's manager and an official of the Soviet Politburo. He arrogantly believes Drago is impossible to defeat and uses his status to boost Soviet supremacy over America in boxing as a result of Drago's defeating Apollo Creed. During the fight between Rocky and Drago, Koloff is seated next to the Soviet premier when he soon notices Drago on the losing end of the fight and insults him, telling him he is disgracing the Soviet Union by letting an American fight admirably on Russian soil. In response, Drago grabs him by the throat, throws him off of the ring apron and proclaims he only fights for himself. He is last seen begrudgingly alongside the Soviet premier applauding Rocky's speech following his defeating of Ivan Drago.

It is implied that after the Soviet collapse he was disgraced by the Politburo as a result of his affiliation with Drago.

Nicolai Koloff was portrayed by American actor Michael Pataki.

George Washington Duke
George Washington Duke is the main antagonist in Rocky V. He is a crooked boxing promoter who first attempts to sign Rocky in a title defense against Union Cane just after the former's return from his fight with Ivan Drago in the Soviet Union. Rocky declines and announces his retirement. Upon discovery of Rocky's health and financial problems, Duke makes another attempt to lure him back into boxing, but is thwarted by Adrian. When he learns that Rocky has no formal management agreement with Tommy Gunn, he corrupts Gunn with a lucrative contract. In response to the crowd and media's negative reaction toward Gunn's reign as champion, Duke has him challenge Rocky to a match. After defeating Gunn in a street fight, Rocky gives Duke an uppercut, despite the latter threatening to sue him.

George Washington Duke is portrayed by Richard Gant.

Marie
Marie is first seen in Rocky as a 12-year-old girl hanging out with other delinquent teenagers in South Philadelphia. Rocky lectures her about her choice of friends, as he does not want to see her grow up to be a "whore". After Rocky walks her back to her home, Marie yells, "Screw you, creepo!" to him.

Marie was originally supposed to appear in Rocky V, where she ended up becoming a prostitute as Rocky had predicted. Though the scene was filmed with Jodi Letizia reprising her role, it was ultimately left on the cutting room floor.

Marie returns in Rocky Balboa as a bartender at the local tavern and a single mother, having recently broken up with a Jamaican man, the father of her son. Rocky hires her as a hostess at "Adrian's" and slowly develops a friendship with her. Marie and her son Stephenson are clearly present in the ringside aftermath of Rocky's fight with Mason "The Line" Dixon.

Marie is portrayed by Jodi Letizia in Rocky and Geraldine Hughes in Rocky Balboa.

Stephenson
Stephenson, nicknamed "Steps", is Marie's son in Rocky Balboa. Rocky acts as a father figure to Steps, bringing him to an animal shelter to find a dog for adoption. There, they pick up an old and ugly dog, which Steps nicknames "Punchy". Steps later is part of Rocky's corner in his fight against Mason "The Line" Dixon.

Stephenson is portrayed by James Francis Kelly III.

Supporting characters

Father Carmine
Father Carmine is a priest and Rocky's spiritual advisor.  He appears in Rocky II, where he conducts Rocky and Adrian's wedding and later on gives his blessings to Rocky before his rematch against Apollo Creed. He reappears in two scenes in Rocky V, when Rocky asks for his blessing upon Tommy Gunn's training, and also after Rocky defeats Tommy in a later street fight.

Father Carmine is portrayed by Paul J. Micale.

Thunderlips
Thunderlips, "The Ultimate Male" and "The Ultimate Object Of Desire" is a heel professional wrestler who fights Rocky in a fundraising boxer vs. wrestler match in Rocky III.

Thunderlips is portrayed by Hulk Hogan.

Amara Creed

Amara Creed is the daughter of Adonis Creed and Bianca Taylor who was born deaf, having inherited her mother's hearing disorder.

In Creed III, she uses sign language to communicate with her parents. Amara aspires to be a professional boxer just like her father, which often gets her into trouble at school.

Amara Creed is portrayed by Mila Davis-Kent.

Union Cane
Union Cane is a fictional boxer in the 1990 film Rocky V. He is portrayed by real-life boxer Mike Williams.

Cane was born and raised in Cherry Hill, New Jersey, US. He began a career as a professional boxer, and began rising up the ranks to become the number one contender. He was represented by George Washington Duke, who was determined to get Cane in the ring with Rocky for a title match. Although Rocky was about to accept as he faced bankruptcy, he was diagnosed with brain damage and forced to retire, having already surrendered the title prior to his match with Ivan Drago. Union Cane fought for and won the vacant title in a tournament but was afforded little respect by the media been seen as a 'paper champion' since he had never faced the previous title holder. He was the world heavyweight champion when he faced Tommy "The Machine" Gunn, Duke's newest client who had been trained by Rocky, and was knocked out in the first round.

Jacob "Stitch" Duran
Jacob "Stitch" Duran is a professional cutman. In Rocky Balboa, he is Mason "The Line" Dixon's cutman. He returns in Creed and Creed II as part of Donnie Creed's corner.

Jacob "Stitch" Duran is portrayed by himself.

Danny "Stuntman" Wheeler

 
Danny "Stuntman" Wheeler is a heavyweight boxer from Los Angeles. He is the undefeated World Champion (WBA, WBC, Ring Magazine Champion) and #2 pound-for-pound boxer in the world behind "Pretty" Ricky Conlan. He fights Donnie Creed in a sparring session at Delphi Gym, where Donnie's father Apollo had also trained. Wheeler knocks Donnie out in under a minute, taking Donnie' Ford Mustang that was placed on the line. He is scheduled to fight "Pretty" Ricky Conlan for the titles but the fight is cancelled after Conlan breaks Wheeler's jaw at the weigh-ins. Wheeler attempts to sue Conlan and the WBC for the incident.

Three years later, Donnie defeats Wheeler for the WBC Heavyweight Championship and gets his Mustang back.

Danny "Stuntman" Wheeler is portrayed by Andre Ward.

Leo "The Lion" Sporino

Leo "The Lion" Sporino is an Italian-American light heavyweight boxer in Creed. Mentored by his father Pete Sporino at Mighty Mick's Boxing Gym, Leo participated in the 2012 U.S. Olympic team and is ranked #4 light heavyweight in the world. He is in the running for a championship run, but is knocked out in the second round of his match with Donnie Creed.

Leo "The Lion" Sporino is portrayed by Gabriel Rosado.

Pete Sporino
Pete Sporino is an Italian-American former boxer turned trainer at Mighty Mick's Boxing Gym. He hopes to have Rocky mentor his son Leo, but is disappointed when Rocky opts to train Donnie Creed instead.

Pete Sporino is portrayed by Ritchie Coster.

References

 
Lists of film characters